José Juan Zamora Gonzales (born January 24, 1987) is a Peruvian footballer who plays as a center back. He currently plays for Colegio Nacional de Iquitos.

Club career
Zamora played the 2008 Copa Perú competition with Colegio Nacional de Iquitos and managed to help the club win promotion back to the Peruvian First Division that season. The following season, he stayed with the Iquitos based club. There Zamora made his Peruvian First Division debut in the 2009 Torneo Descentralizado in Round 3 at home to Sport Huancayo. He played the entire match and helped his side keep a clean sheet with a 2–0 win. Later that season Zamora scored his first goal in the First Division in Round 42 against Sporting Cristal. He scored in the 16th minute in the 3–1 home win at the Estadio Max Augustín.

On December 22, 2009, it was announced that Zamora would join Peruvian giants Sporting Cristal for the start of the 2010 Torneo Descentralizado season.

References

External links
 

1987 births
Living people
Footballers from Lima
Association football central defenders
Peruvian footballers
Colegio Nacional Iquitos footballers
Sporting Cristal footballers
Unión Comercio footballers